Bob Schepers (born 30 March 1992) is a Dutch footballer who plays as a winger for Dutch lower league side Blauw Wit '34. Schepers represented the Netherlands U-17 team at the 2009 UEFA European Under-17 Football Championship and the 2009 FIFA U-17 World Cup.

Club career
Born in Enschede, Schepers started the 2008–09 season in the youth of SC-Cambuur-Leeuwarden. On 24 February 2009, Schepers signed a three-year deal with the club. He made his debut for Cambuur on 24 April 2009 in a 0–1 defeat against Dordrecht, coming on as a substitute for Sandor van der Heide. He was close to a move to FC Groningen, however the move failed to materialise. On 5 February 2010, he made his first appearance in the starting line-up in a 1–1 draw against AGOVV Apeldoorn. Since then, Schepers established himself in the squad, being in the starting line-up against SBV Excelsior on 22 February 2010 and against RBC Roosendaal on 23 April 2010. 

In the 2010 summer transfer window, English Premier League club Everton F.C. tracked Schepers and arranged a trial for him. He was present at the pre-season fixture against Clyde.

On 30 August 2011, Schepers joined Eredivisie side FC Utrecht on a three-year contract with an option to extend for further two years. He returned to his former team Cambuur on a loan deal before the transfer window closed.

In June 2015, after his contract with Cambuur was not extended, Schepers moved to Topklasse side ONS Sneek. His ONS Sneek contract included a release clause allowing him to leave if a professional club would have registered him before 1 September.

In May 2015, it was announced he would return to his youth club Blauw Wit '34.

International career
Schepers was active at the 2009 UEFA European Under-17 Football Championship for the Netherlands, playing as a left winger. Schepers was surprised he made the team stating that while he played for Cambuur, the other players all played for big clubs like Ajax, Feyenoord, and Arsenal. In the group stages, Schepers came on as a substitute in the 2–1 victory over Turkey. In the 2–1 semi-final victory over Switzerland, Schepers was in the starting line-up. In the final against hosts Germany, Schepers again came on as a substitute, however they lost the match 1–2 after extra time.

Schepers was also a member of the Dutch squad for the 2009 FIFA U-17 World Cup in Nigeria, although the team failed to progress beyond the group stage. Schepers played two matches at the tournament, coming on as a substitute against Iran and Colombia.

Statistics

References

1992 births
Living people
Footballers from Enschede
Association football wingers
Dutch footballers
SC Cambuur players
FC Utrecht players
Eredivisie players
Eerste Divisie players
Derde Divisie players
ONS Sneek players
Netherlands youth international footballers